Karaali is a neighborhood of the District of Gölbaşı, Ankara Province, Turkey. The neighborhood used to be a village, and later a neighborhood, of the District of Balâ, but after a reorganization in 2008, its central largest areas went to the District of Gölbaşı, its northern areas went to the District of Çankaya, and its southern areas remained in the District of Balâ.

References

Populated places in Ankara Province
Neighbourhoods of Gölbaşı, Ankara